Booker is an American crime drama series starring Richard Grieco that aired on the Fox Network from September 24, 1989, to May 6, 1990. The series is a spin-off of 21 Jump Street and the second installment of the Jump Street franchise. The character of Dennis Booker was originally a recurring character on that police drama during its third season.

Synopsis
Dennis Booker, who once worked for a large metropolitan police department, is now hired by the US office of a large Japanese company to investigate some suspicious insurance claims. Booker is portrayed as despising authority, and he is often openly disdainful of the orders he receives. He also occasionally undertakes non-work-related tasks in order to help friends and family. Katie Rich left the show in the middle of its run, and Lori Petty was added to the cast.

Fox scheduled Booker as its Sunday night leadoff program, airing in the 7/6 pm slot that was vacated by its parent series, 21 Jump Street; the latter moved to Monday nights. Booker was not the hit that its predecessor had been, with Fox eventually moving the show to 10:00 pm (during the period when the network was programming past that hour on Sundays) and later cancelling it following the season.

Cast

Main
 Richard Grieco as Dennis Booker
 Carmen Argenziano as Chick Sterling
 Marcia Strassman as Alicia Rudd
 Katie Rich as Elaine Grazzo
 Lori Petty as  Suzanne Dunne

Notable guest stars
 Peter DeLuise       as Officer Doug Penhall (from 21 Jump Street)
 Holly Robinson Peete as Officer Judy Hoffs (from 21 Jump Street)
 Steven Williams as Captain Adam Fuller (from 21 Jump Street)
 Jason Priestley     as Fred
 Thomas Haden Church as Michael 
 Ben Vereen           as Ben
 Mariska Hargitay     as Michelle
 Don S. Davis         in various roles
 Maura Tierney        as Donna Cofax
 Marcia Cross
 Don Cheadle
 Vanity
 Gedde Watanabe
 Tawny Kitaen
 James Hong
 Heavy D
 Jay O. Sanders as Gordon Rudd

Episodes

Home media

On September 17, 2008, Beyond Home Entertainment released Booker- The Complete Series on DVD in Australia (Region 4).  The episode titled "Deals and Wheels pt.1" has been removed as it is part of a crossover with 21 Jump Street.  Both episodes are included on the 4th season release of 21 Jump Street. The original Billy Idol "Hot in the City" main theme song is intact on the episodes. The episode "Someone Stole Lucille" is included in this set as well.

On August 25, 2009, Mill Creek Entertainment released Booker- Collector's Edition on DVD in Region 1. Music rights have kept the episode "Someone Stole Lucille" from appearing on the set, thus the reason why the title of the release was changed from 'complete series'. The theme song was also changed to a generic action piece (entitled "Hot Summer Night") as the rights to "Hot in the City" could not be negotiated.

References

External links

21 Jump Street
1989 American television series debuts
1990 American television series endings
1980s American crime drama television series
1990s American crime drama television series
1980s American police procedural television series
1990s American police procedural television series
English-language television shows
Fox Broadcasting Company original programming
American television spin-offs
Television series by Stephen J. Cannell Productions
Television shows set in Los Angeles
Television series created by Stephen J. Cannell